The Forgiveness of Blood is a 2011 Albanian-American drama film co-written and directed by Joshua Marston. The film premiered in competition at the 61st Berlin International Film Festival and competed for the Golden Bear. Marston and co-writer Andamion Murataj won the Silver Bear for Best Script.

The film was originally submitted as the Albanian entry for the Best Foreign Language Film, but it was rejected when Bujar Alimani, director of Amnesty, protested that The Forgiveness of Blood ought not to be eligible due to American input on the project. The AMPAS disqualified it and Albania submitted Alimani's film instead.

The film deals with the consequences of a blood feud on a family in a remote area of modern-day Albania.

Cast
 Refet Abazi as Mark, who incites a blood feud by killing his neighbour Sokol.
 Veton Osmani as Sokol, the neighbour Mark kills in a dispute over a field.
 Tristan Halilaj as Nik, Mark's 17-year-old son.
 Sindi Lacej as Rudina, Mark's 14-year-old daughter.
 Erjon Mani as Tom, 17-year-old friend of Nik.

Plot
After their father and uncle are suspected of murdering a neighbor because of a land dispute, the lives of the children are changed.  Nik, the teenage son, is confined to the house, while Rudina, the oldest girl, is forced to quit high school and take over the family's bread delivery business.  The film contrasts the modernization of rural Albania, where the teenagers text each other and Nik dreams of opening an internet cafe, with centuries-old customs.

Reception
The film earned an 84% "Certified Fresh" rating at Rotten Tomatoes, with an average rating of 7.22/10 based on 69 reviews.

Cultural background
The Kanun is a traditional code of behavior that is followed rarely today in Albania, most notably in the northern highlands in deep mountains when people are stuck in the past traditions, which authorizes an eye-for-an-eye response in event of murder.  According to the Kanun, the family of a murdered person should kill a member of the murderer's family.  Although traditionally only adult males are at risk, there have been instances where females or children have been killed. The revenge killing can only take place outside of the person's home, so at-risk males are often confined to home while females become the sole support of the family.

Awards
Silver Bear for Best Screenplay, Berlin International Film Festival 2011
Silver Hugo for Best Screenplay, Chicago International Film Festival 2011
Special Jury Prize, Hamptons International Film Festival 2011

References

External links
 
 
 
 
The Forgiveness of Blood: How Things Work an essay by Oscar Moralde at the Criterion Collection

2011 films
2011 drama films
Albanian-language films
American drama films
Films directed by Joshua Marston
Films about feuds
Films set in Albania
Albanian drama films
2010s American films